Din Dryfol is a Neolithic burial chamber on Anglesey, in Wales. It is a scheduled monument and is maintained by Cadw. The monument is near Bethel. Three phases of use have been identified, all dating from the Neolithic period.

Burial chamber
Din Dryfol is the remains of a burial chamber, part of a passage grave, a neolithic structure erected in several stages, and a type of burial structure more frequently found in Ireland than in Wales. The first part may have been constructed about 5,000 years ago.

The dolmen is located on a level platform on the flank of a small hill and is oriented northeast to southwest. Excavations in the 1960s and 1970s have identified the different phases of the development. This is the main structure that can be seen today, the capstone having slipped to one side to rest upon the ground. The second chamber was constructed to the northeast of this, and nothing remains of it now. However two post holes show where a wooden portal or some other structure stood. The third chamber was built to the northeast of the second one. The whole structure would have been covered with a mound of earth or rubble, probably small and circular over the original chamber, but much longer and rather wider when all three chambers had been constructed. Excavations have revealed pieces of pottery and cremation sites.

Disturbance and excavation
The site showed evidence of disturbance during the Roman period, with Romano-British pottery unearthed during the 1970s excavations. It was also affected by road-building in the 18th and 19th century, when here was quarrying in the area. There is now no sign of a cairn or mound. The monument was recorded in 1871 by H Pritchard, and excavated by F Lynch, firstly in 1969 to 1970 and again in 1980, which identified the phases of construction. Wooden entrance posts to the second of three chambers, to the east of the earlier structure, were also identified.

References

External links

 cadw.gov.wales/daysout/dindryfolburialchamber

Scheduled monuments in Anglesey
Cadw
History of Anglesey